Lankanectes corrugatus (common names: Sri Lanka wart frog, corrugated water frog) is a species of frog in the family Nyctibatrachidae. It was once monotypic within the genus Lankanectes, until the second species - Lankanectes pera was described in 2018 from Knuckles Mountain Range. It is endemic to Sri Lanka. 

L. corrugatus is an aquatic frog species inhabiting slow-moving rivers in marshy areas. It is a common species. Threats to it are agrochemical pollution and wetland reclamation for housing and vegetable farms.

References

Nyctibatrachidae
Endemic fauna of Sri Lanka
Frogs of Sri Lanka
Amphibians described in 1863
Taxa named by Wilhelm Peters
Taxonomy articles created by Polbot